The British Speedway Under-21 Championship (also known as the British Junior Speedway Championship) is an annual speedway competition open to riders of British nationality aged at least fifteen on the date of the first meeting, and under twenty-one on 1 January in the year of the competition. The winner of the final is declared British Under-21 Champion. Previous winners include former World Champions Mark Loram and Gary Havelock.

Format
Sixteen riders plus three reserves take part in 20 heats with each rider facing each other once. The two riders which accumulate the highest number of points over the heats go straight to the final. The next four highest point scorers take part in a race-off, with first and second place riders also progressing to the final.

Qualification
Seven riders are seeded straight to the final round while nine other riders qualify through three qualifying rounds held on a regional basis which use the same format as the final round. The first, second and third placed riders from each qualifier ride in the final round and fourth place riders take part as reserves. In the final round the reserves may take the rides of any incapacitated rider, replace any rider excluded for a starting infringement, or replace any rider excluded for exceeding the two minute time allowance except in the semi-final or final.

The top three riders go through to the British Speedway Championship final and the winner qualifies for the World Junior Championship semi-final round. The next five finishers qualify for the World Junior Championship qualifying rounds.

British Under-21 Champions

See also
British Speedway Championship
British Speedway Under 18 Championship
Speedway in the United Kingdom

References

British 21
National championships in the United Kingdom
Annual sporting events in the United Kingdom